Sylvester Deadalus (Sly) is a fictional character, a supervillain appearing in American comic books published by Marvel Comics. The character appears in the  NEW-GEN comic books. Created by Chris Matonti, J.D. Matonti, and Julia Coppola, he first appeared in NEW-GEN #1 (2010).

Fictional character biography

Early life
Sylvester Deadalus was born on the 4th of July. As he matured, he developed an interest in science, and eventually apprenticed himself to Gabriel, helping him to create new types of nanotechnology for use in New-Gen. Eventually,  of New-Gen's environment was automated and controlled by the nanobots that he and Gabriel created. Deadalus eventually grew to believe that he could use the nanobots to seize power for himself. In order to destabilize New-Gen and seize power, Deadalus unleashed a huge swarm of nanobots he developed that radically alter the bodies of those they come in contact with. Gabriel destroys the swarm before they can do too much damage, and banishes Deadalus to the underworld as punishment for his uprising.

MetalMites and Crete
While in the underworld, Deadalus stumbles upon the MetalMites, a species of robotic insectoid monsters. He quickly was able to subdue them and bend them to his will, establishing a robotic army for himself. He used the MetalMites to spend years digging through the deep crust of the underworld, traveling across the time-space continuum and onto the ancient island of Crete on Earth. He began destroying structures and trying to establish a dominion using his superior technology. However, he was defeated quickly when Gabriel sent Mini and Horus, a combat robot, back in time to fight him. After being defeated by Mini, he was sent back to the underworld.

Microbots and transformation
Once again trapped in the underworld, Deadalus discovered yet another techno-organic species, the microbots, which he again puts under his mental control. These machines, larger than the nanobots from New-Gen, were small enough, nevertheless, to alter Deadalus' biological structure. His body underwent a radical transformation into a form more closely resembling a devil, granting him super strength, and energy projection abilities, but deepening his megalomania and savage nature. He used the microbots to perform a series of drastic upgrades on the MetalMites, and began to dig again in hopes of reaching New-Gen.

Invasion of Zadaar III
Sly eventually dug his way through the crust of a futuristic city called Zadaar III and almost immediately begins to wreak havoc on it. He used his microbots to alter the plentiful technology present in the city into giant, weaponized robots, similar to the MetalMites. Gabriel dispatched Mini once again to deal with him, but Sly and his forces proved too powerful for Mini to defeat on his own. As Mini became overwhelmed, Gabriel sent the rest of the A.P.N.G. to deal with Sly. Sly, using his newly augmented powers, shot the A.P.N.G. with radiation that killed the nanobots in their bodies, causing the team to revert to their unaltered human forms. As he was about to finish the team off, Sly was attacked by Gabriel, using the full strength of his own nanobot upgrades. Gabriel gave each member of the A.P.N.G. a nano-glove, containing nanobots which restore their powers and strength. Sly and Gabriel fought each other both physically and emotionally with blasts of rainbow until Sly is overwhelmed and defeated. Gabriel, again showing mercy towards his old apprentice, banishes Sly back to the underworld.

Powers and abilities
Deadalus possesses, in his unaltered state, a genius level intellect and the ability to exert his influence over machines using sheer force of will. By using his technopathic abilities, he is able to totally control both the MetalMites and microbots that he discovered living in the underworld. The MetalMites act as a standing army for him, and serve as a means for Deadalus to travel across Milwaukee by digging through the crust of the underworld. Ew. After his vodka-induced transformation into en feggit, Deadalus gained super human strength, agility, a pair of dem j's, and the ability to shoot energy projectiles from his hands.

References

External links 
 https://web.archive.org/web/20110707153446/http://apngenterprises.com/comic/characters-of-new-gen/

Marvel Comics characters with superhuman strength